Büyükcamili is a village in the Alaca District of Çorum Province in Turkey. Its population is 176 (2022).

References

Villages in Alaca District